The Croatia women's national under-17 football team represents Croatia in international football at this age level and is controlled by the Croatian Football Federation, the governing body for football in Croatia.

Competition history
Croatia women's under-17 team took part in the qualification for European Under-17 Championship since its inception in 2008. The tournament is held every year and serves as the qualifying tournament for FIFA U-17 Women's World Cup which is held every two years.

Croatia women's under-17 team never managed to qualify for European championship.

UEFA Women's Under-17 Championship record

See also 

 Croatia women's national football team
 Croatia women's national under-19 football team
 Croatia men's national football team
 Croatia men's national football B team
 Croatia men's national under-23 football team
 Croatia men's national under-21 football team
 Croatia men's national under-20 football team
 Croatia men's national under-19 football team
 Croatia men's national under-18 football team
 Croatia men's national under-17 football team

External links
 Croatia women's national under-17 football team at UEFA.com

Women's national under-17 association football teams